Pristimantis hamiotae is a species of frog in the family Strabomantidae.
It is endemic to Ecuador.
Its natural habitats are tropical moist montane forests and rocky areas.
It is threatened by habitat loss.

References

hamiotae
Amphibians of Ecuador
Endemic fauna of Ecuador
Amphibians described in 1993
Taxonomy articles created by Polbot